Kirtling Tower was a medieval castle and Tudor country house in Kirtling, Cambridgeshire, England, of which the gatehouse still remains.

History
The first documentary records for Kirtling Tower date from 1219, and the 13th century Kirtling Castle was described as having a moat, a ditch and a palisade. In 1424 there was a substantial rebuilding of the castle by Richard de Beauchamp, the Earl of Warwick, with a hundred oak trees used to create a complex with a parlour, a solar and chambers. 

Edward North, a successful lawyer, rebuilt the castle in the 1540s and between 1556 and 1558 using the architect Francis Adams, renaming it Kirtling Hall. The earthworks around the castle were considerably altered to provide for a raised platform for the new house, which included contemporary Tudor features such as a gatehouse, gallery, lodgings, a banqueting house and a garden, complete with grand water features and ponds. Queen Elizabeth I stayed at the castle as the guest of Roger North, 2nd Baron North for three days in September 1578 during her state procession across Cambridgeshire. The visit cost Lord North £642.

The castle continued to develop, and by the 1660s was the largest country house in Cambridgeshire, centered on a symmetrical two-storeyed south-facing range, with east and west wings providing additional accommodation and facilities.

The castle went into decline after 1691 and by 1735 the Victoria County History of the castle describes the property as being "in disorder". Much of the castle was pulled down in 1748 in order to make the remainder habitable for Lord Elibank, but the property went into decline again after his death in 1762. By the 1770s it was unhabitable and most of the castle was pulled down in 1801. In the 1830s the gatehouse was turned into a residential property and was renamed Kirtling Tower; an extension was built in 1872 and the house remained in use under a sequence of tenants.

Today

The main feature of the castle today is the three-storeyed Tudor gatehouse, which closely resembles the gatehouse at Leez Priory, built by North's friend and fellow lawyer Richard Rich. Built of brick, it has octagonal turrets and an oriel window of Italian design. It is a scheduled monument and a Grade I listed building.

See also
Castles in Great Britain and Ireland
List of castles in England

References

Castles in Cambridgeshire